Davaleh may refer to:
 Davaleh-ye Olya
 Davaleh-ye Sofla